Hiroki Shishido (Japanese: 宍戸大樹; born March 16, 1977) is a Japanese welterweight shoot boxer, fighting out of Cesar Gym, Asakusa. He is a former 2004 S-cup world tournament finalist and WMC Intercontinental Super Welterweight champion.

Biography
He defeated Satoru Suzuki via KO (spinning back fist) in the first round at Shootboxing 2012 - Act 4 on September 17, 2012 in Tokyo, Japan to qualify for the 2012 S-Cup.

He competed at the Shoot Boxing World Tournament 2012 in Tokyo, Japan on November 17, 2012. After a majority decision (27-27, 28-27, 28-27) win over Gesias Cavalcante at the quarter-final stage, he was knocked out by the eventual tournament winner Andy Souwer in the first round of their semi-finals bout.

He defeated Hiroyuki Takaya by unanimous decision at Shootboxing 2013 - Act 2 in Tokyo on April 20, 2013. He scored two knockdowns in the first round but was also deducted a point in the third when he kicked a downed Takaya.

He defeated Len Genji by unanimous decision at Shoot Boxing 2013 - Act 4 on June 23, 2013.

Shishido knocked out Moody Rawai in round two to retain his Shootboxing Asia-Pacific title on August 20, 2013 at Shoot Boxing in Fukushima 2013.

He lost to Yuichiro Nagashima by unanimous decision at Shoot Boxing Battle Summit Ground Zero Tokyo 2013 in Tokyo, Japan on November 15, 2013.

Titles

Amateur
All Japan Amateur Shoot boxing championship winner

Professional
SHOOT BOXING
 2001 Shoot Boxing Japan Super lightweight (Seagullweight) Champion
 2005 Shoot Boxing Japan Welterweight Champion (defended once)
 2009 Shoot Boxing Oriental and Pacific Welterweight Champion (defended twice)
 2004 Shoot Boxing S-cup World tournament runner-up

World Muay Thai Council
 2002 WMC Intercontinental Super welterweight Champion

Kickboxing Record 

|-  bgcolor="#FFBBBB"
| 2019-06-02 || Loss ||align=left| Taisei || SHOOT BOXING Hana Yashiki Extreme.1 || Tokyo, Japan || TKO || 2 || 1:50
|-  bgcolor="#CCFFCC"
| 2019-02-11 || Win ||align=left| Atsushi Sasatani || Shoot Boxing 2019 act.1 || Tokyo, Japan || Decision || 3 || 3:00
|-  bgcolor="#FFBBBB"
| 2018-11-18 || Loss ||align=left| Kentaro Hokuto || SHOOT BOXING S-Cup 65kg World Tournament 2018 || Tokyo, Japan || Decision || 3 || 3:00
|-  bgcolor="#FFBBBB"
| 2018-08-18 || Loss ||align=left| Tsukuru Midorikawa || KNOCK OUT SUMMER FES.2018 || Tokyo, Japan || TKO (Doctor Stoppage) || 2 || 1:26
|-  bgcolor="#CCFFCC"
| 2018-06-10 || Win ||align=left| Taiki Tsuchiya || SHOOT BOXING 2018 act.3 || Tokyo, Japan || KO || 3 || 1:08
|-  bgcolor="#CCFFCC"
| 2018-04-01 || Win ||align=left| Bernard Fung || SHOOT BOXING 2018 act.2 || Tokyo, Japan || Decision || 3 || 3:00
|-  bgcolor="#FFBBBB"
| 2016-04-03 || Loss ||align=left| Jaoweha Sirilakgym || SHOOT BOXING 2016 act.2 || Tokyo, Japan || TKO || 3 || 1:14
|-  bgcolor="#FFBBBB"
| 2015-12-01 || Loss ||align=left| Hiroto Uesako || SHOOT BOXING 30th ANNIVERSARY “GROUND ZERO TOKYO 2015 || Tokyo, Japan || Decision || 3 || 3:00
|-  bgcolor="#CCFFCC"
| 2015-09-19 || Win ||align=left| Jaoweha Grandthaiboxing|| SHOOT BOXING 2015～SB30th Anniversary～ act.4 || Tokyo, Japan || Extra Round Decision || 6 || 3:00
|-
! style=background:white colspan=9 |
|-  bgcolor="#CCFFCC"
| 2015-02-21 || Win ||align=left| Koji Yoshimoto || SHOOT BOXING 30th ANNIVERSARY“CAESAR TIME!” || Tokyo, Japan || TKO  || 5 || 1:41
|-  bgcolor="#FFBBBB"
| 2015-02-21|| Loss || align=left| Zakaria Zouggary || SHOOT BOXING 2015～SB30th Anniversary～ act.1 || Tokyo, Japan || Decision (Unanimous) || 3 || 3:00
|-  bgcolor="#FFBBBB"
| 2014-11-30 || Loss ||align=left| Houcine Bennoui || SHOOT BOXING S-cup World Tournament 2014, Quarter Finals || Tokyo, Japan || Decision (Unanimous) || 3 || 3:00
|-  bgcolor="#FFBBBB"
| 2013-11-15 || Loss ||align=left| Yuichiro Nagashima || Shoot Boxing Battle Summit Ground Zero Tokyo 2013 || Tokyo, Japan || Decision (Unanimous) || 3 || 3:00
|-
|-  bgcolor="#CCFFCC"
| 2013-08-10 || Win ||align=left| Moody Rawai || Shoot Boxing in Fukusima 2013 || Fukushima, Japan || KO (spinning back kick) || 2 || 2:03
|-
! style=background:white colspan=9 |
|-
|-  bgcolor="#CCFFCC"
| 2013-06-23 || Win ||align=left| Len Genji || Shootboxing 2013 - Act 4 || Tokyo, Japan || Decision (unanimous) || 3 || 3:00
|-
|-  bgcolor="#CCFFCC"
| 2013-04-20 || Win ||align=left| Hiroyuki Takaya || Shootboxing 2013 - Act 2 || Tokyo, Japan || Decision (unanimous) || 3 || 3:00
|-  bgcolor="#FFBBBB"
| 2012-11-17 || Loss ||align=left| Andy Souwer || Shoot Boxing World Tournament 2012, Semi Finals || Tokyo, Japan  || TKO (punches) || 1 || 2:00
|-  bgcolor="#CCFFCC"
| 2012-11-17 || Win ||align=left| Gesias Cavalcante || Shoot Boxing World Tournament 2012, Quarter Finals || Tokyo, Japan  || Decision (majority) || 3 || 3:00
|-  bgcolor="#CCFFCC"
| 2012-09-17 || Win ||align=left| Satoru Suzuki || Shootboxing 2012 - Act 4  || Tokyo, Japan || KO (spinning back fist) || 1 || 1:03
|-
|-  bgcolor="#FFBBBB"
| 2012-02-06 || Loss ||align=left| Warren Stevelmans || Shootboxing 2012 - Act 1 || Tokyo, Japan || Decision (Unanimous) || 5 || 3:00
|-
|-  bgcolor="#FFBBBB"
| 2011-11-06 || Loss ||align=left| Takeshi Inoue || Shoot the Shooto 2011 || Tokyo, Japan || Decision (Majority) || 3 || 3:00
|-
|-  bgcolor="#FFBBBB"
| 2011-06-05 || Loss ||align=left| Toby Imada || Shootboxing 2011 - Act 3 || Tokyo, Japan || Decision (Unanimous) || 3 || 3:00
|-
|-  bgcolor="#CCFFCC"
| 2011-02-19 || Win ||align=left| Bovy Sor Udomson || Shootboxing 2011 - Act 1  || Tokyo, Japan || Decision (Unanimous) || 5 || 3:00
|-
|-  bgcolor="#FFBBBB"
| 2010-11-23 || Loss ||align=left| Buakaw Por. Pramuk || S-Cup 2010, Quarter Finals || Tokyo, Japan || Decision (Unanimous) || 3 || 3:00
|-
|-  bgcolor="#FFBBBB"
| 2010-09-18 || Loss ||align=left| Miloud El Geubli || Shoot Boxing 25th Anniversary - Ishin 4th Battle || Tokyo, Japan || Ext.R Decision (Majority) || 6 || 3:00
|-
|-  bgcolor="#CCFFCC"
| 2010-06-06 || Win ||align=left| Virgil Kalakoda || Shoot Boxing 25th Anniversary - Ishin 3rd Battle || Tokyo, Japan || KO (Straight Left) || 3 || 2:15
|-
|-  bgcolor="#CCFFCC"
| 2010-04-11 || Win ||align=left| Satoshi Suzuki || Shoot Boxing 25th Anniversary - Ishin 2nd Battle || Tokyo, Japan || TKO (Standing Guillotine Choke) || 2 || 1:39
|-
|-  bgcolor="#CCFFCC"
| 2010-02-13 || Win ||align=left| Greg Foley || Shoot Boxing 25th Anniversary - Ishin 1st Battle || Tokyo, Japan || KO (Standing Guillotine Choke) || 5 || 1:24
|-
|-  bgcolor="#FFBBBB"
| 2009-09-04 || Loss ||align=left| Bovy Sor Udomson || Shoot Boxing 2009 - Bushido 4th  || Tokyo, Japan || KO (Right Hook) || 5 || 0:34
|-
|-  bgcolor="#CCFFCC"
| 2009-06-01 || Win ||align=left| Luke Maitland || Shoot Boxing 2009 - Bushido 3rd || Tokyo, Japan || KO (Standing Guillotine Choke) || 2 || 1:15
|-
! style=background:white colspan=9 |
|-
|-  bgcolor="#CCFFCC"
| 2009-04-03 || Win ||align=left| Luis Azeredo || Shoot Boxing 2009 - Bushido 2nd  || Tokyo, Japan || Ext.R Decision (Unanimous) || 4 || 3:00
|-
|-  bgcolor="#CCFFCC"
| 2009-02-11 || Win ||align=left| Wei Shoulei || Shoot Boxing 2009 - Bushido 1st  || Tokyo, Japan || KO (Knee) || 3 || 1:54
|-
|-  bgcolor="#FFBBBB"
| 2008-11-24 || Loss ||align=left| Andy Souwer || 2008 Shoot Boxing S-Cup World Tournament, Semi Finals || Saitama, Japan || Decision (Unanimous) || 3 || 3:00
|-
|-  bgcolor="#CCFFCC"
| 2008-11-24 || Win ||align=left| Chris Horodecki || 2008 Shoot Boxing S-Cup World Tournament, Quarter Finals || Saitama, Japan || Decision (Unanimous) || 3 || 3:00
|-
|-  bgcolor="#CCFFCC"
| 2008-09-12 || Win ||align=left| Kenji Kanai || Shoot Boxing 2008 Tamashi - Road to S-cup - 5th || Tokyo, Japan || Decision (Unanimous) || 5 || 3:00
|-
|-  bgcolor="#CCFFCC"
| 2008-07-21 || Win ||align=left| Hitoshi Yamaguchi || Shoot Boxing 2008 Tamashi - Road to S-Cup - 4th || Tokyo, Japan || Decision (Unanimous) || 5 || 3:00
|-
! style=background:white colspan=9 |
|-
|-  bgcolor="#CCFFCC"
| 2008-05-28 || Win ||align=left| Antonio Carvalho || Shoot Boxing 2008 Tamashi - Road to S-Cup - 3rd || Tokyo, Japan || Ext.R Decision (Unanimous) || 4 || 3:00
|-
|-  bgcolor="#CCFFCC"
| 2008-04-04 || Win ||align=left| Tsang Hoi Kwan || Shoot Boxing 2008 Tamashi - Road to S-Cup - 2nd || Tokyo, Japan || Ext.R Decision (Unanimous) || 4 || 3:00
|-
|-  bgcolor="#FFBBBB"
| 2007-11-24 || Loss ||align=left| Peter Hoes || Shootboxing in the Autotron || Rosmalen, Netherlands || TKO (Shoulder Injury) || 1 ||
|-
|-  bgcolor="#CCFFCC"
| 2007-10-28 || Win ||align=left| Big Ben Chor Praram 6 || Shootboxing Battle Summit Ground Zero || Tokyo, Japan || Decision (Unanimous) || 3 || 3:00
|-
|-  bgcolor="#CCFFCC"
| 2007-09-30 || Win ||align=left| Tatsuji || WSBA "Shoot Boxing 20th Anniversary Series 4th" || Tokyo, Japan || Decision (Unanimous) || 3 || 3:00
|-
|-  bgcolor="#FFBBBB"
| 2007-06-10 || Loss ||align=left| Yasuhiro Kido || MAJKF "Breakdown 5" || Tokyo, Japan || Decision (Unanimous) || 5 || 3:00
|-
|-  bgcolor="#FFBBBB"
| 2007-02-05 || Loss ||align=left| Keiji Ozaki || K-1 MAX Japan 2007, Quarter Finals || Tokyo, Japan || Decision (Unanimous) || 3 || 3:00
|-
|-  bgcolor="#CCFFCC"
| 2006-12-03 || Win ||align=left| Damacio Page || WSBA "Shoot Boxing 2006 Neo ΟΡΘΡΟΣ Series Final" || Tokyo, Japan || KO (Flying Left Knee) || 2 || 2:02
|-
|-  bgcolor="#FFBBBB"
| 2006-11-03 || Loss ||align=left| Kenichi Ogata || 2006 Shoot Boxing S-Cup World Tournament, Semi Finals || Tokyo, Japan || Decision (Unanimous) || 3 || 3:00
|-
|-  bgcolor="#CCFFCC"
| 2006-11-03 || Win ||align=left| Jordan Tai || 2006 Shoot Boxing S-Cup World Tournament, Quarter Finals || Tokyo, Japan || Ext.R Decision (Unanimous) || 3 || 3:00
|-
|-  bgcolor="#FFBBBB"
| 2006-09-04 || Loss ||align=left| Buakaw Por. Pramuk || K-1 World MAX 2006 Champions Challenge || Tokyo, Japan || KO (Left Hook) || 1 || 0:15
|-
|-  bgcolor="#CCFFCC"
| 2006-05-26 || Win ||align=left| Ian Schaffa || WSBA "Shoot Boxing 2006 Neo ΟΡΘΡΟΣ Series 3rd" || Tokyo, Japan || Decision (Unanimous) || 5 || 3:00
|-
|-  bgcolor="#CCFFCC"
| 2006-03-25 || Win ||align=left| Marfio Canoletti || WSBA "Shoot Boxing 2006 Neo ΟΡΘΡΟΣ Series 2nd" || Saitama, Japan || Decision (Unanimous) || 5 || 3:00
|-
|-  bgcolor="#CCFFCC"
| 2006-02-09 || Win ||align=left| Andre "Dida" Amade || WSBA "Shoot Boxing 2006 Neo ΟΡΘΡΟΣ Series 1st" || Tokyo, Japan || Decision (Unanimous) || 5 || 3:00
|-
|-  bgcolor="#CCFFCC"
| 2005-11-25 || Win ||align=left| Padammgalaf Barjinnikam || WSBA "Shoot Boxing 20th Anniversary Series Final" || Tokyo, Japan || TKO (Corner Stoppage) || 3 || 1:06
|-
|-  bgcolor="#CCFFCC"
| 2005-06-26 || Win ||align=left| Takashi Ohno || WSBA "Shoot Boxing 20th Anniversary Series 3rd" || Tokyo, Japan || Decision (Unanimous) || 5 || 3:00
|-
|-  bgcolor="#CCFFCC"
| 2005-03-06 || Win ||align=left| Koichi Kikuchi || WSBA "Shoot Boxing 20th Anniversary Series 1st" || Tokyo, Japan || Decision (Unanimous) || 5 || 3:00
|-
! style=background:white colspan=9 |
|-
|-  bgcolor="#CCFFCC"
| 2005-01-23 || Win ||align=left| Ole Laursen || Shoot Boxing Ground Zero || Tokyo, Japan || KO (Right High Kick) || 3 || 0:22
|-
|-  bgcolor="#CCFFCC"
| 2004-11-05 || Win ||align=left| Changpuek Sorseprasert || Shoot boxing: Infinity-S Vol.5 || Japan || TKO (Corner Stop/Punches) || 4 || 2:14
|-
|-  bgcolor="#FFBBBB"
| 2004-09-19 || Loss ||align=left| Andy Souwer || S-Cup 2004, Final || Yokohama, Japan || TKO (Ref Stop) || 2 || 0:50
|-
! style=background:white colspan=9 |
|-
|-  bgcolor="#CCFFCC"
| 2004-09-19 || Win ||align=left| Katel Kubis || S-Cup 2004, Semi Finals || Yokohama, Japan || Decision (Unanimous) || 3 || 3:00
|-
|-  bgcolor="#CCFFCC"
| 2004-09-19 || Win ||align=left| Bruce Macfie || S-Cup 2004, Reserve Fight || Yokohama, Japan || Decision (Unanimous) || 3 || 3:00
|-
|-  bgcolor="#CCFFCC"
| 2004-07-19 || Win ||align=left| Takahiro Sasara || Shoot boxing: Infinity-S Vol.4  || Sendai, Japan || TKO (Doc Stop/Fracture) || 1 || 1:11
|-
|-  bgcolor="#CCFFCC"
| 2004-05-09 || Win ||align=left| Yasuhito Shirasu || MAJKF "Supreme 3 - Battlefield Tiger"  || Japan || TKO (Doc Stop/Cut) || 4 || 2:30
|-
|-  bgcolor="#CCFFCC"
| 2004-01-24 || Win ||align=left| Yuki || Ikusa "Future Fighter Ikusa 5 -Ran- Monkey Magic" || Tokyo, Japan || Decision (Unanimous) || 3 || 3:00
|-
|-  bgcolor="#FFBBBB"
| 2003-12-16 || Loss ||align=left| Kurt Finlayson || X-Plosion V || Gold Coast, Australia || Decision (Split) || 5 || 3:00
|-
|-  bgcolor="#FFBBBB"
| 2003-10-25 || Loss ||align=left| Liu Xianwei || Kung Fu vs Shoot Boxing || China || Decision || 5 || 2:00
|-
|-  bgcolor="#CCFFCC"
| 2003-09-23 || Win ||align=left| Tarik El Idrissie || WSBA "S" of the World Vol.5" || Tokyo, Japan || Decision (Unanimous) || 5 || 3:00
|-
|-  bgcolor="#CCFFCC"
| 2003-06-01 || Win ||align=left| Masaaki Kato || WSBA "S" of the World Vol.3" || Tokyo, Japan || 2nd Ext.R Decision (Split) || 7 || 3:00
|-
! style=background:white colspan=9 |
|-
|-  bgcolor="#FFBBBB"
| 2003-04-13 || Loss ||align=left| Tewaritnoi S.K.V. Gym || WSBA "S" of the World Vol.2" || Tokyo, Japan || Decision (Majority) || 5 || 3:00
|-
|-  bgcolor="#CCFFCC"
| 2002-12-15 || Win ||align=left| Brad Hull || X-Plosion Boonchu S-Cup || Gold Coast, Australia || Decision || 5 || 3:00
|-
|-  bgcolor="#CCFFCC"
| 2002-09-22 || Win ||align=left| Tarik Benfkih || WSBA "The Age of "S" Vol.4" || Japan || Decision (Unanimous) || 5 || 3:00
|-
|-  bgcolor="#CCFFCC"
| 2002-07-28 || Win ||align=left| Shannon Forrester || Boonchu Show || Gold Coast, Australia || Decision (Unanimous) || 5 || 3:00
|-
! style=background:white colspan=9 |
|-
|-  bgcolor="#CCFFCC"
| 2002-07-07 || Win ||align=left| Ronald Wolfs || S-Cup 2002, Super Fight || Yokohama, Japan || TKO (Ref Stop/3 Knockdowns) || 2 || 1:07
|-
|-  bgcolor="#CCFFCC"
| 2002-04-28 || Win ||align=left| Shannon Forrester || MAJKF "In Search for the Strongest - Showdown Kickoff" || Japan || TKO (Doc Stop/Cut) || 4 || 2:10
|-
|-  bgcolor="#CCFFCC"
| 2002-03-31 || Win ||align=left| Kotani Naoyuki || WSBA "The Age of "S" Vol.2" || Tokyo, Japan || KO (Straight Right) || 2 || 2:40
|-
|-  bgcolor="#CCFFCC"
| 2002-02-01 || Win ||align=left| Jason Brace || WSBA "The Age of "S" Vol.1" || Tokyo, Japan || TKO (Doc Stop/Knee Injury) || 1 || 3:00
|-
|-  bgcolor="#CCFFCC"
| 2001-11-30 || Win ||align=left| Keichi Samukawa || SHOOTBOXING "INVADE 5th Stage" || Tokyo, Japan || KO  || 2 ||
|-
|-  bgcolor="#CCFFCC"
| 2001-11-20 || Win ||align=left| Shannon Forrester || WSBA "Be a Champ 4th Stage" || Tokyo, Japan || TKO (Doc Stop/Cut) || 2 || 0:39
|-
|-  bgcolor="#CCFFCC"
| 2001-09-25 || Win ||align=left| Sakaguchi Ki || WSBA "Be a Champ 3rd Stage" || Tokyo, Japan || Decision (Unanimous) || 3 || 3:00
|-
! style=background:white colspan=9 |
|-
|-  bgcolor="#cfc"
| 2001-04-30 || Win ||align=left| Kojiro Ganryu|| SHOOT BOXING "Be a Champ 2nd Stage"	 || Tokyo, Japan || TKO || 3 ||  
|-
|-  bgcolor="#cfc"
| 2001-01-13 || Win ||align=left| ||  || || KO || 2 ||  
|-
|-  bgcolor="#cfc"
| 2000-03-24 || Win ||align=left| Kiyohiro ||  || Tokyo, Japan || Decision|| 3 || 3:00 
|-
|-  bgcolor="#cfc"
| 2000-03-24 || Win ||align=left| Kazuya Fujioka||  || Tokyo, Japan || TKO || 2 || 
|-
|-  bgcolor="#cfc"
| 2000-01-24 || Win ||align=left| Kitaoka || SHOOTBOXING INVADE  || Tokyo, Japan || Decision  || 3 || 3:00
|-
|-  bgcolor="#cfc"
| 1999-12-01 || Win ||align=left| Taison Togane || SHOOTBOXING AGAINST 1999 4th || Tokyo, Japan || Decision  || 3 || 3:00
|-
|-  bgcolor="#cfc"
| 1998-08-28 || Win ||align=left| ZAI || Shoot Boxing Michi he no Chousen Part 5 || Tokyo, Japan || Decision  || 2 || 3:00
|-
|-  bgcolor="#FFBBBB"
| 1998-08-28 || Loss ||align=left| Hideki Boku || K-1 Japan Grand Prix '98, Opening Fight || Tokyo, Japan || Decision (Unanimous) || 3 || 3:00
|-
|-  bgcolor="#cfc"
| 1998-06-04 || Win||align=left| Hideki Hyodo|| SHOOTBOXING S・K－XX 2nd || Tokyo, Japan || KO || 2 || 
|-
| colspan=9 | Legend:

See also 
List of male kickboxers
List of K-1 Events

References

External links
Hiroki Shishido Shoot boxing profile
Hiroki Shishido K-1 profile

1977 births
Living people
Japanese male kickboxers
Welterweight kickboxers
Sportspeople from Fukushima Prefecture